Events from the year 1965 in France.

Incumbents
President: Charles de Gaulle 
Prime Minister: Georges Pompidou

Events
5 January – Launch of the Renault 16, the world's first production hatchback car.
14 March – Municipal elections held.
21 March – Municipal elections held.
16 July – The Mont Blanc Tunnel is inaugurated by presidents Giuseppe Saragat and Charles de Gaulle.
22 October – Authors André Figueras and Jacques Laurent are fined for their comments against Charles De Gaulle.
28 October – Foreign Minister Couve de Murville travels to Moscow.
29 October – Mehdi Ben Barka, a Moroccan politician, is kidnapped in Paris and never seen again.
3 November – President Charles de Gaulle announces that he will stand for re-election.
21 November – Mireille Mathieu sings on France's "Télé-Dimanche" and begins her successful singing career.
26 November – At the Hammaguir, a launch facility in the Sahara Desert, France launches a Diamant-A rocket with its first satellite, Asterix-1 on board, becoming the third country to enter space.
5 December – Charles de Gaulle is re-elected as French president.

Sport
22 June – Tour de France begins.
14 July – Tour de France ends, won by Felice Gimondi of Italy.

Births

January to March
4 January – Yvan Attal, actor and director
8 January – Pascal Obispo, singer-songwriter
11 January – Bertrand de Billy, conductor
15 January – Jean-Yves Béziau, philosopher
25 January – Pascal Lefèvre, javelin thrower
23 February – Sylvie Guillem, ballet dancer
28 February – Philippe Gaillot, soccer player
9 March – Benoît Campargue, judoka
15 March – Pascal Tayot, judoka
21 March – Xavier Bertrand, politician and Minister
31 March – Jean-Christophe Lafaille, mountaineer (died 2006)

April to June
19 April – Natalie Dessay, soprano
23 April – René Piller, racewalker
27 April – Patrick Rémy, cross-country skier
20 May – Bruno Marie-Rose, athlete and Olympic medallist
20 May – Jean-Charles Trouabal, athlete
26 May – Christophe Kalfayan, swimmer
5 June – Sandrine Piau, soprano
7 June – Jean-Pierre François, French footballer and singer
12 June – Florence Guérin, actress
17 June – Pascal Despeyroux, soccer player
21 June – François Baroin, politician
23 June – Stéphane de Gérando, composer, conductor, multimedia artist and researcher
27 June – Stéphane Paille, soccer player (died 2017)
29 June – Véronique Laury, businesswoman

July to September
2 July – Luc Borrelli, soccer player (died 1999)
3 July – Bertrand Layec, soccer referee
16 July – Michel Desjoyeaux, sailor
20 July – Laurent Lucas, actor
21 July – Sylvie Giry Rousset, cross-country skier
24 July – Olivier Py, stage director, actor and writer
25 July – Laurent Lucas, actor
5 August – Jean-Marc Morandini, journalist
6 August – Luc Alphand, alpine skier, motor racing driver
7 August – Jocelyn Angloma, international soccer player
13 August – Éric Durand, soccer player
14 August – Emmanuelle Béart, actress
16 August – Stéphane Picq, composer of computer game music
1 September – Jean-François Ballester, figure skating coach (d. 2018)
10 September – Pierre Camara, triple jumper
10 September – Pascal Pinard, swimmer and multiple Paralympic gold medallist
11 September – Jean-Philippe Fleurian, tennis player
17 September – Franck Piccard, Alpine skier and Olympic gold medallist
19 September – Gilles Panizzi, rally driver
19 September – Sabine Paturel, singer and actress
21 September – Frédéric Beigbeder, writer, commentator, literary critic and pundit
24 September – Fabrice Philipot, cyclist (died 2020)

October to December
1 October – Jean-Philippe Ruggia, motorcycle racer
10 October – Éric Blanc, impersonator and comedian
20 October – Jil Caplan, singer and songwriter
25 October – Mathieu Amalric, actor and film director
28 October – Franck Sauzée, soccer player
1 November – Christophe Clement, horse trainer
2 November – Samuel Le Bihan, actor
3 November – Ann Scott, novelist
14 November – Ariel Besse, actress
19 November – Laurent Blanc, international soccer player
22 November – Vincent Guérin, soccer player, coach

Full date unknown
Nicolas Bourriaud, curator and art critic
Sylvain Luc, jazz guitarist

Deaths

January to March
17 January – Pierre-Marie Gerlier, Cardinal (born 1880)
21 January – André Godard, archeologist and architect (born 1881)
28 January – Maxime Weygand, military commander (born 1867)
14 February – Désiré-Émile Inghelbrecht, composer and conductor (born 1880)
20 February 
Théophile Marie Brébant, military officer (born 1889)
René Jeannel, entomologist (born 1879)
March Claude-Léon Mascaux, sculptor (born 1882)
6 March – Jules Goux, motor racing driver (born 1885)
10 March – Jean Boyer, film director and author (born 1901)
20 March – Louis de Fleurac, athlete and Olympic medallist (born 1876)
22 March – Pierre Courant, politician (born 1897)

April to June
1 April – Daniel Barbier, astronomer (born 1907)
20 April – Arsène Alancourt, cyclist (born 1904)
23 April – Georges Périnal, cinematographer (born 1897)
24 April – Pierre Wertheimer, businessman and racehorse owner (born 1888)
12 May – Roger Vailland, novelist, essayist, and screenwriter (born 1907)
20 May – Charles Camoin, painter (born 1879)
15 June – Maurice Monney-Bouton, rower and Olympic medallist (born 1892)
25 June – Jacques Bacot, explorer and Tibetologist (born 1877)
26 June – Maurice Brocco, cyclist (born 1885)

July to September
9 July – Jacques Audiberti, playwright, poet and novelist (born 1899)
17 July – Eugène Bigot, composer and conductor (born 1888)
27 July – Henri Daniel-Rops, writer and historian (born 1901)
7 August – Jean Dargassies, racing cyclist (born 1872)
19 August – René Lasserre, rugby union player (born 1895)
31 August – Henri Mignet, aircraft designer and builder (born 1893)
2 September – Émile Muselier, Admiral (born 1882)
15 September – Noël Delberghe, water polo player and Olympic medallist (born 1897)
23 September – Lionel Terray, climber (born 1921)

October to December
November – Marguerite Jeanne Carpentier, painter and sculptor (born 1886)
6 November – Edgard Varèse, composer (born 1883)
18 November – Jean Médecin, lawyer and politician (born 1890)

Full date unknown
Albert Besson, hygienist and physician (born 1896)
Donatien Bouché, sailor and Olympic gold medallist (born 1882)
Marcel Boucher, jewellery designer (born 1898)
Aimée Antoinette Camus, botanist (born 1897)
Jean Favard, mathematician (born 1902)
Colette Reynaud, journalist (born 1872)

See also
 List of French films of 1965

References

1960s in France